Mona Josephine Tempest Fitzalan-Howard, 11th Baroness Beaumont, Baroness Howard of Glossop, OBE (née Stapleton; 1 August 1894 – 31 August 1971) was a British peer.

Personal life
Mona was the elder of two daughters of Miles Stapleton, 10th Baron Beaumont, and his wife, Ethel Mary (née Tempest).  Her father accidentally shot and killed himself on 16 September 1895, at which point the barony fell into abeyance between his two daughters. The barony was called out of abeyance in Mona's favour on 1 June 1896. 

On 5 September 1914 at St Mary's Church, Carlton, Yorkshire, she married the 3rd Baron Howard of Glossop (thus also becoming Baroness Howard of Glossop). She and her husband were one of the few couples to both hold titles in their own right.  They had eight children, of whom the eldest son and first-born child became 17th Duke of Norfolk in 1975, and his brothers and sisters were all granted the rank, style and precedence of a duke's younger son (as if their father had lived to succeed as duke himself):

 Hon. Miles Fitzalan-Howard, later 12th Baron Beaumont, 4th Baron Howard of Glossop and 17th Duke of Norfolk (1915–2002)
 Hon. Michael Fitzalan-Howard (1916–2007), later Lord Michael Fitzalan-Howard, who married twice and left children by both marriages.
 Hon. Mariegold Jamieson (1919–1992), later Lady Mariegold Jamieson, married Jerrie Jamieson, Esq. (son of Sir Archibald Jamieson), and left children
 Hon. Martin Fitzalan-Howard (1922–2004), later Lord Martin Fitzalan-Howard, who married and left children.
 Hon. Miriam Hubbard (1924–1997), later Lady Miriam Hubbard, married Lt. Cdr. Peregrine Hubbard and had children.
 Hon. Miranda Emmett (1929-2018), later Lady Miranda Emmett, married Hon. Christopher Emmett (son of the Baroness Emmet of Amberley), and has children.
 Hon. Mirabel Kelly (1932–2009), later Lady Mirabel Kelly, married Bernard Kelly (son of Sir David Victor Kelly) and left children.
 Hon. Mark Fitzalan-Howard (born 1937), later Lord Mark Fitzalan-Howard, who is married with children.

In the New Years honours list for 1946, Lady Beaumont was appointed OBE for her services during World War II to the British Red Cross at York Military Hospital, Goole.

Due to a spinal injury, in later life she used a wheelchair. After the passage of the Peerage Act 1963, Beaumont became the third peeress in her own right to take her seat in the House of Lords; her husband pushed her wheelchair when she took her seat. She never spoke in the House of Lords. On her death in 1971 at the age of 77, her title passed to her eldest son, Miles, who inherited the dukedom of Norfolk from his father's cousin in 1975 and added his mother's maiden name to his own.

Her great-granddaughter is actress Gabriella Wilde.

References
 BEAUMONT, Who Was Who, A & C Black, 1920–2008; online edn, Oxford University Press, December 2007, accessed 1 September 2010.

1894 births
1971 deaths
Barons Beaumont
Mona Fitzalan-Howard, 11th Baroness Beaumont
Hereditary women peers
Howard of Glossop
Officers of the Order of the British Empire
British women in World War II